Sharon M. Weiss is an American professor of electrical engineering and physics at Vanderbilt University. Weiss has been awarded a Presidential Early Career Award for Scientists and Engineers (PECASE), an NSF CAREER award, an ARO Young Investigator Award, and the 2016–2017 IEEE Photonics Society Distinguished Lecturer award for her teaching and fundamental and applied research on silicon-based optical biosensing, silicon photonics for optical communication, and hybrid and nanocomposite material systems. She is the Cornelius Vanderbilt Chair in Engineering at Vanderbilt University, in addition to the Director of the Vanderbilt Institute of Nanoscale Science and Engineering (VINSE).

Early life and education 
Weiss received her PhD from the Institute of Optics at the University of Rochester, where her dissertation, "Tunable Porous Silicon Photonic Bandgap Structures: Mirrors for Optical Interconnects and Optical Switching," was supervised by Philippe Fauchet.

Research 
Weiss's research lab focuses on light-matter interactions and applications of photonic nanomaterials, including silicon and mesoporous silicon-based optical structures for more sensitive and faster biomolecule detection, and the ultrafast modulation of optical signals using hybrid material ring resonators.

Awards 
 Fellow, SPIE and OSA
 2016–2017 IEEE Photonics Society Distinguished Lecturer
 Vanderbilt School of Engineering Excellence in Teaching Award
 Presidential Early Career Award for Scientists and Engineers (PECASE)
 ARO Young Investigator Award
 NSF CAREER Award

References 

American electrical engineers
Living people
Place of birth missing (living people)
Engineering academics
Vanderbilt University faculty
University of Rochester alumni
Optical engineers
Year of birth missing (living people)
Women in optics